A list of organizations for the advancement of respiratory care.

A
 Alabama Society for Respiratory Care
 Alaska Society for Respiratory Care
 Associazione Scientifica Interdisciplinare per lo Studio delle Malattie Respiratorie (AIMAR) (Italy)
 Associazione Italiana Pneumologi Ospedalieri (AIPO) (Italy)
 American Association for Respiratory Care (AARC) (United States)
 American College of Chest Physicians (ACCP) (United States)
 American Thoracic Society (ATS) (United States)
 Asian Pacific Society of Respirology (APSR)
 Asociación Argentina de Medicina Respiratoria (Argentina)
 Associación Latin Americana del Tórax (ALAT)
 Austrian Society of Pneumology (ASP) (Austria)
 Association of Respiratory Care Practitioner in the Philippines Inc (ARCPP) (Philippines)
 Association of Respiratory Therapists Singapore (ARTS) (Singapore)

B
 Belgian Thoracic Society
 Brazilian Thoracic Society
 British Thoracic Society
 Bulgarian Society of Respiratory Diseases

C
 Canadian Society for Respiratory Therapy
 Canadian Thoracic Society
 Croatian Respiratory Society
 Colorado Society for Respiratory Care

D
 Deutsche Gesellschaft für Pneumologie und Beatmungsmedizin e.V. (Germany)
 Dutch Thoracic Society (NVALT)

E
 European Respiratory Society (ERS)
 Egyptian Society of Chest Diseases and Tuberculosis
 European Society of Thoracic Imaging (ESTI)
 Estonian Respiratory Society
 European Academy of Allergology and Clinical Immunology (EAACI)
 European Federation of Allergy and Airways Diseases Patients’ Associations (EFA)
 European Lung Foundation (ELF) ( World Spirometry Day (WSD) )

G
 Global Smoke Free Partnership (GSP)

H
 Hellenic Thoracic Society (Greece)
 Hungarian Respiratory Society

I
 Indian Association of Respiratory Care (IARC) (India) Official Website (External Link) Indian Association of Respiratory Care
 Indian Chest Society
 International Society for Aerosolin Medicine (ISAM)
 Irish Thoracic Society
 International Council for Respiratory Care (ICRC) Official Website (External Link)

K
 Kazakhstan National Respiratory Society (Kazakhstan)
 Kyrgyz Thoracic Society

L
 Latvian Society of Lung Physicians
 Lebanese Pulmonary Society

M
 Malayali Association of Respiratory Care (MARC)
 Médecins sans frontières (MSF) (Doctors Without Borders)
 Moroccan Society of Allergy and Clinical Immunology

N
 National Research Institute of Tuberculosis and Lung Disease (Iran)
 National Board for Respiratory Care (NBRC)

P
 Pakistan Chest Society
 Pan African Thoracic Society (PATS)
 PHILIPPINE SOCIETY FOR THE ADVANCEMENT OF RESPIRATORY THERAPY
Polish Respiratory Society
 Primary Care Respiratory Journal (PCRJ)

R
 Romanian Society of Pneumology
 Russian Respiratory Society
 Respiratory Therapists Society of Republic of China, RTSROC

S
 Saudi Thoracic Society
 Schweizerische Gesellschaft für Pneumologie (Switzerland)
 Slovak Pneumological and Ftiseological Society
 Slovenian Respiratory Society
 Sociedad Chilena de Enfermedades Respiratorias (Chile)
 Sociedad Española de Neumología y Cirugía Torácica (Spain)
 Sociedade Portuguesa de Pneumologia (Portugal)
 Société Algérienne de Pneumophtisiologie (Algeria)
 Société de Pneumologie de Langue Française (SPLF)
 Society of Albanian Pulmonologists
 South African Thoracic Society

T
 Taiwan Society of Pulmonary and Critical Care Medicine
 Taiwan Society for Respiratory Therapy, TSRT
 Texas Society for Respiratory Care
 The European Association for Cardio-Thoracic Surgery (EACTS)
 The Finnish Respiratory Society
 The Japanese Respiratory Society
 Tunisian Society of Respiratory Disease and Allergology
 Turkish Respiratory Society
 Turkish Thoracic Society

Respiratory therapy
Pulmonology and respiratory therapy organizations